Chokurdakh (Çokuurdaax) is an urban locality (an urban-type settlement) and the administrative center of Allaikhovsky District of the Sakha Republic, Russia. As of the 2010 Census, its population was 2,367.

Geography
Chokurdakh is located on the left bank of the Indigirka River, below its confluence with the Allaikha. The Yana-Indigirka Lowland lies to the west and northwest, and the Kondakov Plateau to the east, beyond the other bank of the Indigirka.

History
It was founded in 1936 as the new administrative center of Allaikhovsky District, which was established in 1931. It served as a river port on the Indigirka, connecting to sea traffic using the Northern Sea Route. Urban-type settlement status was granted to it in 1981.

Administrative and municipal status
Within the framework of administrative divisions, the urban-type settlement of Chokurdakh serves as the administrative center of Allaikhovsky District. As an administrative division, it is incorporated within Allaikhovsky District as the Settlement of Chokurdakh. As a municipal division, the Settlement of Chokurdakh is incorporated within Allaikhovsky Municipal District as Chokurdakh Urban Settlement.

Economy and infrastructure
Chokurdakh is not connected with the outside world by any year-round roads. A winter road follows the Indigirka River upstream when it is frozen, traveling partly along the river ice, leading to Ust-Nera via Belaya Gora and Khonuu.

Chokurdakh is served by the Chokurdakh Airport, one of the most northerly airports in Russia, which may be unusable during strong winds and snowstorms.

Climate
Chokurdakh has an extreme subarctic climate (Dfc), bordering on polar. Temperatures have never risen above freezing from October 20 through to April 11. The record high is 32.0 C on 23 July 2020 and the record low is -54.4 C on 9 January 1964.

References

Notes

Sources
Official website of the Sakha Republic. Registry of the Administrative-Territorial Divisions of the Sakha Republic. Allaikhovsky District. 

Urban-type settlements in the Sakha Republic
Road-inaccessible communities of the Sakha Republic
Indigirka basin